The Sahatandra is a small river that flows thru Andasibe, Moramanga, Alaotra-Mangoro Region, Madagascar and the Andasibe-Mantadia National Park.

Its mouth is in the Vohitra river in Andasibe, Moramanga.

References

Rivers of Alaotra-Mangoro
Rivers of Madagascar